Todd Martin (born July 8, 1970) is an American retired tennis player. He reached the men's singles final at the 1994 Australian Open and the 1999 US Open and achieved a career-high singles ranking of world No. 4.

Playing career
Martin was born in Hinsdale, Illinois, and played tennis for two years at Northwestern University before turning professional in 1990. His parents lived in Lansing, Michigan, where Martin went to nearby East Lansing High School. At Northwestern, he was a member of the Delta Tau Delta fraternity. He won his first top-level singles title in 1993 at Coral Springs, Florida. Martin traveled with good friend David Helfer for much of the '92 season. Helfer went on to play at Kalamazoo College.

Coached by Robert Van't Hof, 1994 proved to be a breakout year for Martin. At the year's first Grand Slam tournament, he reached the men's singles final at the Australian Open, where he lost in straight sets to No. 1 Pete Sampras. At Wimbledon, he made it to the semifinals, before falling to the eventual champion Sampras; the set that Martin took from Sampras in the match was the only set that Sampras lost during the entire tournament. Martin's third Grand Slam semifinal of 1994 came at the US Open, where he again fell to the eventual champion, this time Andre Agassi. He also captured singles titles at Queen's Club and the Regions Morgan Keegan Championships in Memphis, the latter of which was the first back-to-back titles.

Martin was a member of the US team Davis Cup for nine consecutive years and part of the championship squad in 1995 (beating Russia 3–2 in the final). He also reached the final of the 1995 Grand Slam Cup, where he lost in straight sets to Goran Ivanišević. He reached the Wimbledon semifinals again in 1996, but eventually lost 10-8 in the fifth set against MaliVai Washington, after holding a 5–1 lead in the final set and serving for the match twice. Martin would later reflect on the outcome and admit that he choked during the crucial moments of the match.[1] He missed most of the 1997 season due to injury, but came back to win two singles titles in Barcelona and Stockholm in 1998.

In 1999, Martin had a solid year, reaching the quarterfinals of both the Australian Open and Wimbledon, and reached his second Grand Slam final at the US Open. Along the way, Martin had a memorable battle with Greg Rusedski in the fourth round, in which Rusedski held numerous advantages, including a two sets to love lead, serving for the match in the third set, and a 4–1 advantage in the fifth. Yet, Martin was able to prevail in five sets. Martin won 20 of the final 21 points of the match, despite playing with a heavily bandaged leg and dealing with dehydration.[2] In the final, he faced Andre Agassi in a five-set contest, which Agassi eventually won. Martin won another singles title in Sydney that year, and reached his career-high singles ranking of No. 4.

In 2000, Martin again turned in a strong performance at the US Open, reaching the semifinals before falling to the eventual champion, Marat Safin, in straight sets. As with the previous year's tournament, Martin made another grueling comeback from a two-set deficit in the fourth round, this time against Carlos Moyà.

Martin was named the ATP's Most Improved Player in 1993, and won its Sportsmanship Award in 1993 and 1994. He was president of ATP Players Council for 1995–97 and 1998–99.

From 1994 to 1996, Martin was coached by Robert Van't Hof, from 1997 to 2002, he was coached by Dean Goldfine.

In his career, Martin won eight singles and five doubles titles. He retired from the professional tour in 2004. He is currently the CEO of the International Tennis Hall of Fame.

Grand Slam finals

Singles: 2 (0–2)

Other significant finals

Grand Slam Cup finals

Singles: 1 (0–1)

Masters Series finals

Singles: 1 (0–1)

ATP career finals

Singles: 20 (8 titles, 12 runner-ups)

Doubles: 10 (5 titles, 5 runner-ups)

ATP Challenger and ITF Futures finals

Singles: 4 (2–2)

Performance timelines

Singles

Doubles

Top 10 wins

Post-playing
Martin participates on the Outback Champions Series tennis event for the former members of the ATP tour.[1] Martin finished 2006 ranked third and 2007 ranked first in the Outback Series.

Senior tour titles 

 2006: Champions Cup Boston – defeated John McEnroe 6–3, 4–6, [10–8]
 2007: Gibson Guitars Champions Cup – defeated McEnroe 7–5, 7–5
 2008: The Oliver Group Champions Cup – defeated McEnroe 6–3, 6–1

Coaching 
After his playing career, Martin coached Mardy Fish, World #18 from 2004-2007 then Novak Djokovic, World#1 from 2009-2010. Martin credits his own development to coaches Rick Ferman, youth coach and mentor; Jose Higueras, coach and teacher throughout professional career; and Dean Goldfine who coached Martin for seven years.

In 1993, he founded Todd Martin Youth Leadership, in his hometown of Lansing, Michigan that serves at risk youth and provides tennis, education and leadership programming to over 10,000 children to date. He continues to volunteer his time and visits when able.

CEO, International Tennis Hall of Fame 
The ITHF stewards the history of tennis, honors the players and contributors to the sport of tennis. As CEO, Martin drives globalization, leading all elements of the 501c3 nonprofit business, strategic planning, revenue generation, and ambassadorial duties. He is responsible for the day-to-day operations of the seven-acre national historic landmark including an American Alliance of Museums accredited museum, a 20 court public tennis facility, an ATP Tour professional tournament, and enshrinement process.

Volunteer Service 
Martin's foray into leadership came as president of the ATP Player's Council. Elected by the players, Martin served as the primary player advisor to ATP player relations, executive leadership and board of directors. He was the media spokesperson for all ATP Tour players' affairs and led meetings of the player council and general player body. Martin volunteered his time for the board of directors of the USTA (post-playing career) for more than a decade.

Martin serves on the board of directors for the Tennis Industry Association, and he is on the Oracle US Tennis Awards advisory council.

After his playing career, he did public speaking for corporations and organizations such as Mayo Clinic - Jacksonville, USTA and ITA. He was a booth and studio analyst for various television, radio and web broadcasters to include CBS Sports Net, ESPN.com, and Tennis Channel. Martin wrote several publications for USA Today and Tennis Magazine. He participated and consulted for a variety of events for charities, schools and corporations to include Goldman Sachs, Wells Fargo, and Fidelity Investments.

He remains as board director of the Tennis Industry Association and is a member of advisory staff for RacquetFit.

Honors and awards 
Martin has been inducted into several Hall of Fames including those of Northwestern University (2001), Greater Lansing Sports (2002), Intercollegiate Tennis Association (2007), and the USTA Midwest (2008).

Martin was the recipient of the ATP's Most Improved Player Award (1993), ATP Sportsmanship Award (1993, 1994) and the International Club’s prestigious Jean Borotra Sportsmanship Award (2002) and the ATP World Team Cup Fair Play Award (2003).

Family 
 
Martin married his wife in December of 2000. Together, the pair have three children, Jack, Cash & Gwen.

References

External links

 
 
 

American male tennis players
American tennis coaches
Northwestern Wildcats men's tennis players
Olympic tennis players of the United States
People from East Lansing, Michigan
People from Hinsdale, Illinois
Tennis people from Illinois
Tennis players at the 2000 Summer Olympics
1970 births
Living people
Novak Djokovic coaches